Milton C. Sernett is an American historian, author, and professor at Syracuse University. He has published many books, articles and book chapters on African American history. His published works in African-American history focus on abolitionism, religion, biographies and the Underground Railroad. He has spent several years studying the anti-slavery movements in Upstate New York, particularly, the life of Harriet Tubman.

He currently teaches in the Department of Religion, History Department and Department of African American Studies at Syracuse University.

Early life
He is a graduate from Concordia Seminary in St. Louis, Missouri. He received his master's degree and Ph.D. in American history from the University of Delaware in 1972. He served as s research fellow at the WEB Du Bois Institute at Harvard University and a Fulbright Senior Scholar at the John F. Kennedy Institute for North American Studies, in Berlin

Published works

Books
Harriet Tubman: Myth, Memory, and History - 2007
North Star Country: Upstate New York and the Crusade for African American Freedom, Syracuse University Press - 2002 
African American Religious History: A Documentary Witness, Duke University Press-  1999
Bound for the Promised Land: African American Religion and the Great Migration, Duke University Press - 1997 
Abolition's Axe: Beriah Green, Oneida Institute, and the Black Freedom Struggle, Syracuse University Press - 1986 
Afro-American Religious History: A Documentary Witness, Duke University Press - 1985 (1985-86 Choice Outstanding Academic Book)
Afro-American Religious History: Documents and Interpretations, Syracuse University - 1981.
Black Religion And American Evangelism: White Protestants, Plantation Missions, and the Flowering of Negro Christianity, 1787-1865 - 1975

Other publications
“African American Religion,” for The Oxford Companion to United States History
“On Freedom’s Trail: Researching the Underground Railroad in New York State,” for Afro-Americans in New York Life and History

Honors
 vice-chair - New York State Freedom Trail Commission - 2004

References

External links

Living people
University of Delaware alumni
Syracuse University faculty
21st-century American historians
21st-century American male writers
Writers from Delaware
African-American history of Delaware
Historians of the United States
Historians from New York (state)
Year of birth missing (living people)
Historians of New York (state)
Concordia Seminary alumni
American male non-fiction writers
20th-century American historians
20th-century American male writers